Hepatocyte nuclear factors (HNFs) are a group of phylogenetically unrelated transcription factors that regulate the transcription of a diverse group of genes into proteins.  These proteins include blood clotting factors and in addition, enzymes and transporters involved with glucose, cholesterol, and fatty acid transport and metabolism.

Function 

As the name suggests, hepatocyte nuclear factors are expressed predominantly in the liver.  However HNFs are also expressed and play important roles in a number of other tissues so that the name hepatocyte nuclear factor is somewhat misleading.  Nevertheless, the liver is the only tissue in which a significant number of different HNFs are expressed at the same time.  In addition, there are a number of genes which contain multiple promoter and enhancer regions each regulated by a different HNF.  Furthermore, efficient expression of these genes require synergistic activation by multiple HNFs.  Hence hepatocyte nuclear factors function to ensure liver specific expression of certain genes.

As is the case with many transcription factors, HNFs regulate the expression of a wide variety of target genes and therefore functions.  These functions (and especially functions involving the liver) include development and metabolic homeostasis of the organism.  For example, HNFs  influence expression of the insulin gene as well as genes involved in glucose transport and metabolism.  In embryo development, HNF4α is thought to have an important role in the development of the liver, kidney, and intestines.

Disease implication 

Variants of the  genes can cause several relatively rare forms of MODY, an inherited, early onset form of diabetes.   Mutations in the HNF4α, HNF1α, or HNF1β genes are linked to MODY 1, MODY 3, and MODY 5 respectively. Mutations in HNF genes are also associated with a number of others diseases including hepatic adenomas and renal cysts.

Members 

The following is a list of  human hepatocyte nuclear factors (see also boxes to the right for additional information about these proteins):

HNF1 

Members of the HNF1 subfamily contain a POU-homeodomain and bind to DNA as homodimers. 
 HNF1α/TCF1/MODY3 (related disease: MODY 3)
 HNF1β/TCF2/MODY5 (related disease: MODY 5)

HNF3 

The HNF3 subfamily members contain a winged helix DNA-binding domain and bind to DNA as monomers.

 HNF3α/FOXA1 (forkhead box A1)
 HNF3β/FOXA2 (forkhead box A2)
 HNF3γ/FOXA3 (forkhead box A3)

HNF4 

Members of the HNF4 subfamily are nuclear receptors and bind to DNA either as homodimers or RXR heterodimers.
 HNF4α/TCF14/MODY1
 HNF4γ

HNF6 
The HNF6 subfamily members contain a cut-homeodomain (ONECUT) bind to DNA as monomers.
 HNF6α/OC-1/ONECUT1 
 HNF6β/OC-2/ONECUT2 

See also
 HNF4
 Transcription (genetics)
 Maturity onset diabetes of the young

References

Additional images

External links
 
 Transcription networks in the liver
 transthyretin promoter, an example of a regulatory region containing HNF binding sites
 HNF4 in genetics of diabetes

Metabolism
Signal transduction
Transcription factors